Alphandia is a plant genus of the family Euphorbiaceae first described as a genus in 1873. It is native to certain islands in the western Pacific (New Guinea, Vanuatu, New Caledonia).

species
 Alphandia furfuracea Baill. - New Caledonia, Aneityum 
 Alphandia resinosa Baill. - Art Island in New Caledonia
 Alphandia verniciflua Airy Shaw - West New Guinea

References 

Euphorbiaceae genera
Crotonoideae
Flora of Papuasia
Taxa named by Henri Ernest Baillon